Hardik Himanshu Pandya (born 11 October 1993) is an Indian international cricketer who is the current vice-captain of the Indian cricket team in limited overs. An All-rounder who bats right-handed and bowls right-arm fast-medium, Pandya has played in all 3 formats for India. He also plays for Baroda cricket team in domestic cricket and captains the newly debuted franchise Gujarat Titans in the Indian Premier League (IPL) and led them to their maiden IPL title in the 2022 edition. His elder brother Krunal Pandya is also a cricketer.

Early years
Hardik Pandya was born on 11 October 1993 in Surat, Gujarat. His father, Himanshu Pandya, ran a small car finance business in Surat which he shut down and moved to Vadodara when Hardik was five to provide his sons with better cricket training facilities. Himanshu Pandya worked as Loan agent in Vadodara. He enrolled his two sons into Kiran More's cricket academy in Vadodara. Lacking finances, the Pandya family lived in a rented apartment in Gorwa, with the brothers using a second-hand car to travel to the cricket ground. Hardik studied at the MK High School until ninth grade before dropping out to focus on cricket.

Hardik made steady progress in junior-level cricket, and according to Krunal, "won a lot of matches single-handedly" in club cricket. In an interview with the Indian Express, Hardik revealed that he was dropped from his state age-group teams due to his "attitude problems". He added that he was "just an expressive child" who did not "like to hide his emotions."

According to his father, Hardik was a leg spinner until the age of 18 and turned to fast bowling at the insistence of the Baroda coach Sanath Kumar.

Domestic career 
Pandya has been playing for the Baroda cricket team since 2013. He played a vital role in helping Baroda win the Syed Mushtaq Ali Trophy in the 2013–14 season. In January 2016, he slammed eight sixes during his innings, scoring 86 runs not-out, to guide the Baroda cricket team to a six-wicket win over Vidarbha cricket team for the Syed Mushtaq Ali Trophy.

Indian Premier League
Pandya played for the Mumbai Indians in the IPL from 2015 to 2021. Against the Kolkata Knight Riders, in a must-win situation for Mumbai Indians to remain in the playoff race, he scored 61 runs off 31 balls to win the match for his side, earning him his second man of the match award in the season.

Ahead of the IPL 2022 mega auction, Pandya was released by the Mumbai Indians. He was then drafted by the new Ahmedabad franchise, Gujarat Titans, and named captain of the team. He led Gujarat to their maiden IPL title in 2022, becoming the first captain after Shane Warne to lead a team to the title in its first year.

International career

T20Is 
Pandya made his Twenty20 International debut for India on 27 January 2016 at the age of 22, picking up 2 wickets against Australia. His first Twenty20 International wicket was Chris Lynn. In the second T20I against Sri Lanka cricket team at Ranchi, he batted ahead of Yuvraj Singh and MS Dhoni and hit 27 off 14 balls before becoming hat-trick victim of Thisara Perera. In Asia Cup 2016, Pandya smashed an 18-ball 31 helping India post a respectable score against Bangladesh. Later on, he also picked up a wicket to secure the win. In the next match against Pakistan he bowled his best figures of 3 for 8 which restricted Pakistan to 83. In a 2016 World Twenty20 match against Bangladesh on 23 March, Pandya took two crucial wickets in the last three balls of match's final over as India beat Bangladesh by one run. His career best bowling figures of 4 for 38 was achieved in the 3rd and final Twenty20 International against England on 8 July 2018, he got 33 Not Out in 14 balls, hitting the winning runs with a six off Jordan. Hardik became first Indian to take 4 wickets and score above 30 runs in a T20I in the same match.

In September 2021, Pandya was named in India's squad for the 2021 ICC Men's T20 World Cup. However, Pandya failed to make an impact as was expected. He scored 11 against Pakistan, which India lost by 10 wickets. His subsequent innings of 23 against New Zealand did not help to further India's cause in the tournament as losing against New Zealand meant India crashed out of the World Cup despite winning big over inexperienced teams like Afghanistan, Scotland, and Namibia. Pandya was picked as an allrounder. However he only bowled 2 overs against New Zealand without picking any wickets and giving away 17 runs. His lack of runs and inability to contribute with the ball led to his dropping from the squad for the T20I series that followed the World Cup against New Zealand.

In June 2022, Pandya was named India's captain for their T20I matches against Ireland.

On July 7, 2022, Pandya achieved his first T20 international half-century against England at The Rose Bowl ground in Southampton, scoring 51 runs on 33 balls. Pandya also took 4 wickets, making him the first Indian player to record a half-century and take 4 wickets in a single T20 international match.

ODI career 
Pandya made his One Day International (ODI) debut for India against New Zealand on 16 October 2016 at Dharamshala. He became the fourth Indian to be named player of the match on ODI debut after Sandeep Patil, Mohit Sharma and K. L. Rahul. In his first ODI innings as a batsman, he scored 36 runs from 32 balls. In the group stages of ICC Champions Trophy, Pandya hit three consecutive sixes off Imad Wasim in the same over before rain stopped play. On 18 June 2017, in the final of the Champions Trophy at the Oval, he struck a 43-ball 76 in a losing cause, after coming in with India at 54/5 following a top order collapse.

He was selected in the ODI XI of the year 2017 by Cricinfo.

In April 2019, he was named in India's squad for the 2019 Cricket World Cup. On 27 June 2019, in the match against the West Indies, Pandya played in his 50th ODI.

On 17 July 2022, Pandya bowled his ODI career-best 4–24 against England in Old Trafford. His 71 runs scored during the 2nd innings of the same match made him the first Indian player to score a half-century and take 4 wickets in an ODI since Yuvraj Singh in 2011.

Test career 
Pandya was included in India's Test squad for their home series against England in late 2016, but was eventually left out after he injured himself while training in the nets at the PCA Stadium. He was named in the squad that toured Sri Lanka in July 2017 and played his first Test on 26 July in Galle. In the 3rd and the final Test match against Sri Lanka at Pallekele, Pandya scored his maiden Test century, and set the record for becoming the first Indian batsman to score a Test century just before lunch. He also set the record for scoring the most runs in a single over of a Test innings for India, scoring 26 runs. This century was his first century in international cricket.

Personal life 
Pandya got engaged to an Indian-based Serbian dancer and actress Nataša Stanković in January 2020. In July 2020, their first child Agastya Pandya was born.

His brother Krunal Pandya has also played for India and the Mumbai Indians. Their father, Himanshu Pandya died in January 2021, following a cardiac arrest.

Controversy 
In January 2019, Pandya appeared with teammate K. L. Rahul on the show Koffee with Karan, and made several controversial comments which were met with immediate public backlash. During the interview, Pandya spoke about how he had proudly informed his parents of his first sexual encounter, which was well received by them. He also proclaimed that he likes to "observe how women move" at high-end bars and nightclubs, as well as on social media and then went on to liken himself to a black person saying, "I'm a little from the black side so I need to see how they move". The public categorized his monologue as indecent, derogatory, misogynistic and disgraceful. Pandya apologized for his remarks by saying that he had gotten carried away by the nature of the show.

The Board of Control for Cricket in India (BCCI) responded to the controversy by saying, "It will be considered whether players should even be allowed to appear on such TV shows which have got nothing to do with cricket." The BCCI found the comments as very crass, sexist and cringeworthy, and was not impressed by the apology, seeking appropriate legal action into the matter as it was a breach of conduct. Both Pandya and Rahul were handed a suspension until a pending investigation and were called back from the ongoing tours of Australia and New Zealand. Furthermore, on 13 January 2019, Gillette suspended their brand association with Pandya for its Mach3 razor. On 24 January 2019, after lifting the suspension on Pandya and Rahul, the BCCI announced that Pandya would re-join the squad for the matches in New Zealand.

References

External links

 

1993 births
Living people
Indian cricketers
India Test cricketers
India One Day International cricketers
India Twenty20 International cricketers
Baroda cricketers
Mumbai Indians cricketers
Cricketers from Surat
Cricketers at the 2019 Cricket World Cup
Gujarat Titans cricketers